"Wetin We Gain" is a song by Nigerian singer and songwriter Victor AD. It was released by ETIN Records on June 17, 2018. The song peaked at number 3 on Africa Charts' list of the "Surprise Nigerian Hit Songs of 2018". The accompanying music video for "Wetin We Gain" has garnered over 12 million views on YouTube.

Composition 
"Wetin We Gain" focuses on themes of materialism and material success. Victor AD described the song as a "hustler's anthem" and said it is based on his personal experiences; he also characterized it as a conversation between God and himself. According to the sheet music published at yallemedia.com, "Wetin We Gain" is written in the key of G#major with a tempo of 64 beats per minute. The song follows a chord progression of G# - C# -D#.

Music video
The official music video for "Wetin We Gain" was uploaded to YouTube on July 27, 2018; it was directed by Adindu Collins. An alternative video, featuring a live performance of the song, was released to YouTube on January 19, 2019.

Reception
"Wetin We Gain" received positive reviews from music critics. Joey Akan of The Guardian called it an "aspirational song" and said it represents "the Nigerian dream". Pulse Nigeria's Ehis Ohunyon commended Victor AD for "narrating the daily fears of the average Nigerian" and praised the song for "weaving its way into cultural sentiments without passing any judgement".

Accolades

Track listing
CD single and digital download
"Wetin We Gain" – 3:35

Other versions
 Rap version – 3:53
 Official extended live session – 5:15

References

2018 songs
Victor AD songs